Envoy Air is an American regional airline headquartered in Irving, Texas, in the Dallas–Fort Worth metroplex. The airline is a wholly owned subsidiary of the American Airlines Group and it is paid by fellow group member American Airlines to staff, operate and maintain aircraft used on American Eagle flights that are scheduled, marketed and sold by American Airlines.

Envoy Air operates a fleet consisting of exclusively Embraer regional jet aircraft. The company has a team of more than 18,000 employees, operating more than 1,000 daily flights to over 150 destinations in the United States, Canada, Mexico, Caribbean and South America.

Envoy was formerly known as American Eagle Airlines and was formed when American's parent company merged several airlines owned by the group and operating regional flights. The name was changed to avoid confusion with other regional carriers that operate on behalf of American Eagle. The name "American Eagle Airlines" was also used between April 1980 and April 1981 by an unrelated air charter service that suspended operations and filed bankruptcy before flying any scheduled operations.

History 

Envoy began as a collection of regional carriers with contracts to carry the American Eagle brand name.  The first American Eagle flight was operated by Metroflight Airlines, which was a wholly owned subsidiary of Metro Airlines (formerly Houston Metro Airlines), on 1 November 1984, from Fayetteville, Arkansas, and Fort Smith, Arkansas, to Dallas/Fort Worth International Airport. Metroflight utilized Convair 580 turboprop aircraft that had been formerly operated by Frontier Airlines.

Other carriers that have flown in American Eagle livery include Executive Airlines, Command Airways, Air Virginia, Simmons Airlines, Chaparral Airlines and Wings West Airlines. Among other aircraft in its fleet, Chaparral flew Grumman I-C turboprops which were stretched, 37 passenger regional airliner versions of Grumman's successful propjet business aircraft and was one of only a few air carriers to ever operate the type in scheduled passenger service.

Until 1987 these third-party carriers flew under contract with American Airlines to provide regional feed to its hubs. During 1987 and 1988 AMR Corp. acquired its regional carriers, starting with Simmons Airlines. AMR's final airline d.b.a. American Eagle acquisition was Executive Airlines in 1989.

By mid-1991 AMR had consolidated the number of carriers to four. The May 15, 1998, merger of Wings West and Flagship into Simmons (and the name change of Simmons Airlines to American Eagle Airlines) reduced the number of carriers flying as American Eagle under separate operating certificates to two: American Eagle Airlines and Executive Airlines.

American Eagle Airlines launched its regional jet service in May 1998 using Embraer ERJ 145 aircraft.

AMR struck a codesharing deal with Trans World Airlines (TWA), allowing TWA to sell American Eagle Airlines flights feeding into Los Angeles and later New York's JFK Airports. These services were branded by TWA as Trans World Connection flights. These American Eagle Airlines/Trans World agreements were forged well in advance of AMR's acquisition of TWA in 2001.

During 2007, AMR began studying ways to spin American Eagle Airlines off into a separate company, including, but not limited to, the possibilities of selling the company to either stockholders or to an unaffiliated third party. In 2008, AMR said any plans had been put on hold until the airline industry stabilized after the worldwide financial crisis.  In July 2011, AMR announced the spin-off of American Eagle Airlines but those plans were again shelved when AMR filed for bankruptcy in November 2011.

On 14 January 2014, American Airlines Group officially announced the rebranding of its American Eagle subsidiary as Envoy. Aircraft operated by American Eagle continued to operate under the current American Eagle branding, but an "Operated by Envoy Air" label was added, similar to the label used by other contract airlines that fly aircraft with American Eagle livery. This name change was created to avoid confusion when American Airlines announced that other regional carriers would operate on behalf of American. The term 'Envoy' is a reincarnation of the now deprecated Envoy Class of seating on US Airways aircraft.

Corporate affairs 

The headquarters is in Irving, Texas, in two buildings located north of the northeast portion of DFW Airport.

American Eagle was previously headquartered at the American Airlines headquarters in Fort Worth, Texas, and had employees in several buildings: HDQ1, HDQ2, the Systems Operations Control (SOC) center, the DFW American Eagle hangar, the DFW-area warehouse CP-28, the Flight Academy, and the Flagship University. It was scheduled to consolidate operations and move 600 employees from the headquarters, SOC, and training divisions into the Irving offices in July 2014, which were formerly occupied by Epsilon.

Destinations

Crew bases
 Chicago, Illinois – (O'Hare International Airport)
 Dallas/Fort Worth, Texas – (Dallas/Fort Worth International Airport)
 Miami, Florida – (Miami International Airport)
 Phoenix, Arizona – (Phoenix Sky Harbor International Airport) (begins May 01, 2023)
There were previously bases in Boston, Los Angeles, Nashville, New York, Raleigh/Durham, and San Juan.

Fleet 

As of March 2023, the Envoy Air fleet consists of the following aircraft:

In September 2009, AMR Corporation announced plans to add a First Class cabin to its fleet of 25 Bombardier CRJ700 regional jets and also signed a letter of intent with Bombardier, Inc. to exercise options for the purchase of 22 additional CRJ700 aircraft for delivery beginning in the middle of 2010.

In January 2014, American Eagle's pilots' union reached an agreement with the regional carrier's management that guaranteed 60 of the 90 new Embraer 175 aircraft that American Airlines ordered in December were to be operated by Eagle. The deal included options for 90 other aircraft to be operated by the regional carrier. Delivery of the aircraft would begin in the first quarter of 2015. This deal was voted down by the pilots' union, the Air Line Pilots Association (ALPA).

Envoy was awarded 40 new Embraer 175 aircraft with 90 options. Deliveries began on November 13, 2015.

In October 2016, Envoy announced that they had taken delivery of two additional Embraer 175 aircraft.

In May 2018, Envoy announced that they had taken delivery of fifteen additional Embraer 175 aircraft between March and November 2019 bringing the total of E175's to 69 by the end of 2019.

In November 2018, Envoy announced that they had taken delivery of an additional fifteen Embraer 175 aircraft totaling 84 by mid-2020.

In December 2019, Envoy transferred all of the remaining Bombardier CRJ700 aircraft to PSA Airlines.

In March 2020, it was announced that all twenty of the Embraer 175 aircraft operated by Compass Airlines would be transferred to Envoy upon their closure in April 2020.

In February 2021, American Airlines announced that the remaining ERJ140 fleet belonging to Envoy would end service on May 5, 2021.

On March 1, 2021, Envoy is welcoming an order of six Embraer 170 jets to the fleet and is expected to enter the fleet in 2021.

Historical turboprop fleet 
The American Eagle brand operated a variety of twin turboprop aircraft over the years via its various regional and commuter airline partners, including the ATR 42 and ATR 72; Beechcraft Model 99; British Aerospace Jetstream 31 and 32 models; CASA C-212 Aviocar; Convair 580; Fairchild Swearingen Metroliner; Grumman Gulfstream I (stretched G-IC model); NAMC YS-11; Short 330 and Short 360; and the Saab 340.

Incidents and accidents 

 January 2006: American Eagle Flight 3008 from San Luis Obispo to Los Angeles, a Saab 340B+ operated by American Eagle Airlines, encountered icing at 11,000 feet and regained control only at 6,500 feet, after some 50 seconds' descent. During the incident, in which no one was injured, the autopilot disconnected, the stall alarm/clacker sounded, and the plane rolled sharply left and right, experienced vibration, and pitched down. Manual deice boots were activated and ice could be heard shedding off and striking the fuselage. After this incident, the National Transportation Safety Board (NTSB) issued a safety recommendation which referenced other Saab 340 icing incidents, including the American Eagle Flight 4184 accident.
 On November 11, 2019, American Eagle Flight 4125 slid off the taxiway at Chicago O’Hare Airport after landing on runway 10L in icy conditions. The Embraer 145LR was taken out of the snow later. None of the 41 occupants were injured.
 On 24 October 2020, an American Eagle ERJ-145LR (N674RJ) operating as Envoy Air Flight 4194 from Miami to Freeport, Bahamas had a runway excursion upon landing. Nobody was injured in the crash. The aircraft had suffered main gear damage and the left main broke off.
 On 31 December 2022, A baggage handler employed by Piedmont Airlines, an American Airlines regional carrier, was killed on the ramp at Montgomery Regional Airport when sucked into the jet engine of an Envoy Embraer 175 which was scheduled to fly as American Airlines Flight 3408.

See also 
 AAdvantage
 American Eagle (airline brand)
 Air transportation in the United States

References

External links 

 Envoy Air
 American Eagle Latitudes
 American Eagle page at American Airlines website

Companies based in Irving, Texas
American Airlines
Regional Airline Association members
Oneworld affiliate members
Companies that filed for Chapter 11 bankruptcy in 2011
Airlines established in 1984
Regional airlines of the United States
Airlines based in Texas
1984 establishments in Texas